The Ciechocinek Formation is a Jurassic (lower to middle Toarcian) geologic formation which extends across the Baltic coast from Grimmen, Germany, to Nida, Lithuania, with its major sequence in Poland and boreholes in Kaliningrad. Dinosaur species uncovered here, including Emausaurus and other unclassified genus.

In Poland, the main basin lacks marine microfauna. The Ciechocinek Formation in the Częstochowa-Zawiercie area reveals the remains of a wide range of prehistoric environments; the Fore-Sudetic Monocline region must have been an extensive bay similar to Lake Maracaibo in Venezuela. The basin's shore zone was a flat, muddy, marshy coastal plain.

The region has the remains of the Wrêczyca River, which was active for most of the Pliensbachian/Toarcian period. At the Brody-Lubienia borehole (Lubienia), which once formed part of the river's east side, an alluvial system ended at a delta and discharged into a shallow marine bay and lagoon. A number of phyllopods and fossilized plant roots have been found here, where they were discharged by the river.



Foraminifera

Annelida

Brachiopoda

Bivalvia

Gastropoda

Cephalopoda

Crustacea
Small indeterminate shrimps, sometimes found associated in great numbers, are recovered on several layers at Grimmen.

Arachnida

Insecta
Insects are a common terrestrial animals that were probably drifted to the sea due to Moonsonal conditions present on the Ciechocinek Formation. In Klein Lehmhagen insects are found as part of calcareous nodules in the exaratum-elegantulum subzones, with specimens also found in living chambers of Eleganticeras elegantulum macrochonchs and in fish coprolites which are the most frequent fossils at all. In the elegantulum the insect fauna is dominated by beetle elytra, indicating strong fluvial imput and a nearshore deltaic complex. On Dobbertin, insects are present in the exaratum nodules, where fluvial imput is seen thanks to the phyllopod abundance and  whole bedding planes covered by algae substituted by Ca-phosphat, being this the layers where insects are most abundant.

Echinodermata
In Dobbertin, the echinoderm remains are rare in contrast to foraminifera, phyllopods and ostracods, yet in some places they attain a percentage of the total fauna between 0.7-26.5%. In the upper layers they're totally absent, as well on the erractics and in the whole Grimmen sequence.

Vertebrates

Fishes

Actinopteri

Chondrichthyes

Sarcopterygii

Ichthyosaurs

Sauropterygia

Crocodyliformes

Dinosauria

Plantae

Coals

The Łęka Coal Basin has been known since 1800 for its abundant deposits; younger material has been suggested as redeposited from the Paleozoic, but the basin primarily yields a series of Pliensbachian-Toarcian coals. In the Early Jurassic the Blanowice Formation was surrounded by land on the north, east and south, the source of sediment which was deposited as nearshore coal. This coal is abundant in the upper part of the formation, dominated by alluvial and lacustrine sand and coal-bearing sediments. Organic matter associated with the coal includes the oldest known biomolecules (in the Mrzygłód clay-pit), composed of labdanoic acid, ferruginol, sugiol and 7-oxototarol. The extracted samples were recovered at the Wysoka Lelowska 47Ż and Jaworznik 124Ż boreholes; five core samples were taken from the Żarki 90Ż core, the latter from an approximately  coal seam. The random reflectance (%Rr) of the coals is 0.47–0.56, indicating sub-bituminous coal. The geochemical data suggest low-maturity sediments, and hopane isomers are relatively high in all samples. This is confirmed by unstable biomolecules in the coal samples, including labdanoic acid, ferruginol, sugiol, oxototarol, beta-sitosterol and cholesterol.

The coals are generally dominated by vitrinite macerals, except for a high percentage of inertinite. This indicates wildfires or peat fires, confirmed by charcoal fragments. Sesquiterpenes and diterpenes, common in conifers, angiosperms and bryophytes, were also recovered from the coal. Vitrinite has a reflectance value of 0.49-0.56 %Ro. The cupressaceae and podocarpaceae families are considered the main peat-forming plant species, due to the presence of phenolic abietanes and dehydroabietic acids. Lignite indicates significant benzohopane derivatives in the surrounding sandstones, probable differences in biodegradation, and a typically low coalification range. Later, larger studies note the influence of fires on the region.

The Kaszewy coals, found in an approximately  section of terrestrial and marine siliciclastic sediments in the Kaszewy-1 and Niekłan PIG-1 boreholes, are the Ciechocinek Formation's major coals. This section was in a nearshore-deltaic setting, with increased terrestrial and marine organic matter reflecting increased weathering and transport of terrestrial matter. Abundant fossil charcoal and polycyclic aromatic hydrocarbons have been found. The number of coarse fossil charcoal particles (larger than 125 micrometers) in the Pliensbachian-Toarcian sections of the Kaszewy-1 core is very low (0-15 particles/10 g sediment), and fine charcoal particles (<125 μm) are more abundant (~12,000–256,000 particles/10 g sediment); there are also more non-charcoal particles. There are more fine charcoal particles at the beginning of the Toarcian, reflecting environmental changes. In the polycyclic aromatic hydrocarbons, the pyrolytics (benz-anthracene, benzo(k)fluoranthene, fluoranthene, indeno[1,2,3-cd]pyrene, phenanthrene and pyrene) were detected in a wide variety of samples; phenanthrene is the most abundant component and coronene the least, suggesting the burning of organic matter. Petrogenics are more abundant on the coal samples than pyrolytics, suggesting low wildfire activity. Although the Kaszewy-1 borehole did not indicate increased wildfire activity, the fine fossil-charcoal abundance and pyrolytic concentration indicate regional wildfires. Pyrolytics indicating the increased wildfire activity match the beginning of the Toarcian anoxic event, with intervals of fewer wildfires. Wildfire changes match the Lower Toarcian negative carbon-isotopes emissions measured on the, which probably promoted a rise in atmospheric oxygen. Some questions remain; the climate was warmer and wetter (which can suppress wildfire activity), and wildfires persisted in the Kazewy-1 borehole wildfire activity was successfully sustained. Wildfires may have subsided due to a lack of suitable fuel.

Biomass
Beyond proper palynogy, biomass associated has been recovered, specially on the Brody-Lubenia borehole, with abundance of C29 diasterenes (>70%), that proves a great contribution of land plants and thus terrestrial deposits nearby. There is also in some levels abundance of algae-derived C27 and C28 diasterenes, coeval with acritachs, prasinophytes and dinoflagellates, being this last ones important primary producers in the Polish Basin. The presence of C27 sterols points to the importance of the dinoflajellates, but also other groups, such as Bangiophyceae and Eustigmatophyceae algae or marine protists like the Thraustochytriaceae. At Parkoszowice in parasequences “b” to “f” an increase of C27 and C28 diasterenes, that can be interpreted to reflect enhanced biomass contribution from aquatic algae groups, but may also reflect a decline in land plant contributions. At least in some facies there is evidence of proliferation of freshwater-tolerant algae in the brackish environments of the Polish Basin. As well the samples have provided the evidence of methane oxidizers from wetlands, whose emissions contribute to the early Toarcian carbon cycle perturbation.

Resins

Megaspores 
Polish Lower Toarcian palynology is assigned to the Paxillitriletes phyllicus (Ph) level (Isoetales), due to the abundance of this genus. The lower part of the Toarcian level has numerous occurrences of this species, sometimes before the genera Erlansonisporites sparassis (Selaginella-like) and Minerisporites volucris (Isoetaceae) in the Gorzów Wlkp. IG 1 borehole. The upper part contains less of the genus. The most common species found on Poland in this era include Erlansonisporites sparassis, E. excavatus, Minerisporites volucris and Biharisporites scaber (Lycopodiopsida); Aneuletes potera and Trileites murrayi (both Selaginella) are found on the upper levels. The Toarcian disturbance of the carbon cycle recorded on the Ciechocinek Formation, coincides roughly with the appearance of Paxillitriletes phyllicus. The type of dominant palynomorphs recovered changed from pollen grains during the Upper Pliensbachian to megaspores, indicating a climatic change from moderate and relatively dry to warm and humid in the early Toarcian. This shift in local climate correlates with a global maritime transgression in which volcanism in the Karoo-Ferrar large igneous provinces raised the global temperature and disrupted the carbon cycle, creating a major greenhouse effect. The prevalence of megaspore Paxillitriletes phyllicus correlate with warmth and humidity; the flora, dominated by the family Isoetaceae, requires standing water to reproduce. The megaespore Paxillitriletes phyllicus then drops significantly, indicating a return to a more moderate climate during sedimentation of the younger Borucice Formation.

Bryophyta

Lycophyta

Equisetidae

Filicopsida

Cycadeoidophyta

Gnetophyta

Gnetophyta

Coniferophyta

Fossil Wood
The Blanowice Coals fossil wood from Zawiercie area were already described in 1917 as “Blanowicer Keuperholz”, on the basis of specimens from the “Elka”, “Kamilla” and “Zygmunt” coal pits, claimed to be xylologically similar, yet no taxon was named and the collection was not preserved. Based on recent revisions of the local flora, likely belong to Agathoxylon.

Megaflora 
The Lublin upland fluvial sandstones contain diverse fossil flora, associated genera and species with Lower Jurassic sediments. Carboniferous flora, similar to that of Jurassic formations, appeared in boreholes near the planned Bogdanka Coal Mine. The age of the plant material was not determined until 2020, when it was identified as Lower Toarcian (with some Late Pliensbachian strata). The Brody-Lubienia borehole is abundant in terrestrial palynomorphs and aquatic biomass. The sediments from Brody-Lubienia have a more-terrestrial character, indicated by the frequent occurrence of plant roots and paleosol horizons; moisture was probably fresh (not saline) water. The environment was probably dry, developing flora near freshwater inflow from the east.

The Lublin lias is dominated by cycads and Bennetites Ginkgoales. Ferns occur sporadically in the bottom of the Toarcian, where deposits are filled with coal, mudstone, sandstone and clay siderite (reworked from the Carboniferous) and pebbles from Devonian limestones. Similar boreholes and nearby deposits indicate the end of a river which transported Devonian-Carboniferous deposits from the northeast to the aquatic inland environment. Vegetation grew primarily outside the sedimentation area, on shores and in shallow water.

At Ahrensburg there are plant remains in all horizons: wood, plant chaff and, in the Eleganticeras layers, nutty fruits, Araucariaceous cones, conifer branches, horsetail, etc.

Equisetopsida

Pteridospermatophyta

Bennettitopsida

Ginkgoidae

Coniferophyta

References

Geologic formations of Germany
Geologic formations of Poland
Toarcian Stage
Jurassic System of Europe
Deltaic deposits
Lagoonal deposits
Shallow marine deposits
Fossiliferous stratigraphic units of Europe
Paleontology in Germany
Paleontology in Poland
Jurassic Germany
Toarcian life
Fossils of Germany
Fossils of Poland
Prehistoric fauna by locality